Grey's Anatomy is an American television medical drama series created by Shonda Rhimes and broadcast by ABC. The show features an ensemble cast of lead characters, along with multiple supporting cast members. During its first season, the show featured nine lead characters. Throughout subsequent seasons, many characters have been written out, either due to actors electing to depart the show or due to screenwriters altering character arcs. The following is a list of characters by role type who have appeared over the various seasons since the drama's premiere.

Main characters

Chiefs of surgery 

Meredith Grey is the show's central protagonist and narrator of most episodes. She begins the series as an intern and has since progressed along her medical career path. She went to the Geisel School of Medicine at Dartmouth College after sleeping around Europe with her former best friend, Sadie. She is best friends with Cristina Yang. Following a long romance, she marries neurosurgeon Derek Shepherd. On the day of the shooting in Season 6, she discovers that she is pregnant, but she miscarries the baby due to stress that same day. She later learns that she has a "hostile uterus" and starts taking fertility shots. When they are unsuccessful, Meredith and Derek adopt Zola, a surgical African orphan. In Season 9, following the plane crash that killed her younger sister, Lexie Grey, Meredith becomes an attending general surgeon. She has earned the nickname "Medusa" from her interns and residents. Bailey is born in the Season 9 finale; she gives birth to him by C-section and has major abdominal surgery following a fall. In the Season 10 finale, she says goodbye to Cristina as Cristina leaves for Zurich to take Burke's hospital; before they say goodbye, Cristina reminds Meredith that she should not let Derek's career hinder her own. In Season 11, Meredith struggles with keeping her marriage afloat after Derek decides to work for the president in DC and learning that she has another half-sister, Maggie Pierce. After Derek is killed at the end of Season 11, Meredith escapes to California for a year, where she gives birth to their daughter, whom she names Ellis after her late mother. In Season 12, Meredith returns to Seattle and is named Chief of General Surgery by the newly appointed Chief of Surgery, Miranda Bailey. Meredith tries moving on by dating William Thorpe, a surgeon from another hospital, but has trouble forgetting about Derek. She can finally take the next step with Nathan Riggs, and the two begin a relationship after months of Nathan pursuing Meredith. Still, the romance comes to an end after Nathan's missing fiancée, Megan, is found. Meredith wins a Catherine Fox Award in Season 14 after performing a ground-breaking abdominal wall transplant on Megan. In Season 15, she begins a relationship with Andrew DeLuca after sharing a kiss at Alex and Jo's wedding. She is fired from the hospital after Season 15 for committing insurance fraud. In Season 16, she is forced to do community service while her medical license status hangs in the air; after a hearing, she can keep her license and is rehired by Grey Sloan. On her first day back, she meets Cormac Hayes, the new Chief of Pediatrics, whom she grows closer to as they bond over their shared loss of a spouse. During this time, she and Andrew also break up after Meredith confronts him over his developing signs of mania. In Season 17, Meredith tests positive for COVID-19, and while she battles for her life, she falls in and out of consciousness as she dreams of Derek, George, Andrew, Lexie and Mark. She eventually recovers and begins operating again, as well as assumes the position as Director of the Residency Program.

Department chiefs 

Although he only appeared in the first two episodes of the ninth season, Eric Dane was still billed as a member of the main cast in those two episodes.

Attending physicians 

Although he only appeared in the first five episodes of the fourteenth season, Martin Henderson was still billed as a primary cast member in those five episodes.

Surgical fellows

Resident physicians

Supporting characters

Hospital surgeons
The following listings reflect each character's status at the time of their first appearance on staff at Seattle Grace/Seattle Grace Mercy West/Grey Sloan Memorial.

Attending physicians

Resident Physicians

Surgical interns

Hospital nurses

Other hospital physicians

Non-staff physicians

Family members

Meredith Grey's family

 Ellis Grey (Kate Burton, Sarah Paulson–1982 flashback, Sally Pressman-1983 flashbacks): Meredith's mother and Maggie's biological mother, a highly respected surgeon who trained at Seattle Grace with Richard Webber. During their residency, she and Richard had an affair. She left her husband Thatcher for Richard, but he could not bring himself to leave his wife. After her residency, she left Seattle to take a position at Mass General. She also worked at the Mayo Clinic. She has won the Harper Avery award twice, and she invented the laparoscopic Grey method. She developed early-onset Alzheimer's shortly before Meredith started medical school and, at the start of the show, she has been placed in Roseridge Home for Extended Care, a nursing home. She dies of cardiac arrest during Season 3. In the episode "Drowning on Dry Land," she appears to her daughter Meredith, encouraging her to go back and live her life. She also appears in an alternate-reality episode from Season 8, called "If/then." In the Season 11 episode, "She's Leaving Home," Meredith gives birth to a daughter, whom she named after her mother. In the Season 14 episode, "Who Lives, Who Dies, Who Tells Your Story," she appears in an OR gallery as an image applauding Meredith as she wins her first Harper Avery award.
 Thatcher Grey (Jeff Perry): Father of Meredith, Lexie, and Molly Grey. He was married to Ellis Grey, Meredith's mother, for about seven years. They divorced after she had an affair with Richard Webber. Thatcher blames Ellis for his estrangement from Meredith, saying Ellis is "cold" and won't let him get to know his daughter. After his first family's disintegration, Thatcher remained in Seattle and married his second wife, Susan. They had two daughters, Lexie and Molly. After Meredith moves to Seattle for her residency, Susan encourages Thatcher and Meredith to develop a relationship. However, Susan's sudden death devastates Thatcher, and he blames her death on Meredith. He becomes an alcoholic, and Lexie has to give up a residency at Massachusetts General Hospital to move to Seattle to care for her father. He eventually enters rehab and apologizes to his daughters. However, his alcoholism has destroyed his liver, and Meredith has to give him a portion of hers to save his life. In season 15, he has not spoken to Meredith since Lexie died and suffers from acute myeloid leukemia. Before he dies, he makes amends with Meredith.
 Susan Grey (Mare Winningham): Meredith's stepmother, who was aware of Meredith though she had not met her until Molly becomes a patient at Seattle Grace. She reaches out to Meredith and encourages her to develop a relationship with Thatcher. At first, Meredith resists Susan's attempts to mother her but eventually thinks of Susan as a surrogate mother. She dies following a rare complication from a routine procedure to treat her acid reflux and hiccups.
 Molly Grey-Thompson (Mandy Siegfried): Daughter of Thatcher and Susan Grey, Lexie's younger full sister and Meredith's half-sister. She proposes to her husband, Eric, before being shipped out by the military to be stationed in Iraq. Originally a patient at Mercy West, Molly transfers to Seattle Grace when she is 32 weeks pregnant, and Addison operates to repair a congenital diaphragmatic hernia in Molly's baby. She later gives birth to a daughter, whom she names Laura.
 Laura Thompson: Daughter of Molly Grey and Eric Thompson and Lexie's niece and Meredith's half-niece. She is born prematurely and kept at Seattle Grace Hospital several weeks after her birth, prompting her grandfather, Thatcher Grey, to hang around.
 Alexandra "Lexie" Grey (Chyler Leigh): Meredith Grey's half-sister. Daughter of Thatcher and Susan Grey. She and Meredith have a rocky relationship at the start but become close as the show progresses. She and Mark Sloan are in a long-term relationship before they are killed in a plane crash.
 Margaret "Maggie" Pierce (Kelly McCreary): Daughter of Ellis Grey and Richard Webber. Meredith's half-sister. Born in Boston, after Ellis and Meredith moved there, leaving Thatcher in Seattle, she was given up for adoption. She becomes a skilled heart surgeon and eventually moves to Seattle, becoming Chief of Cardio at Grey Sloan Memorial Hospital after Cristina Yang leaves.
 Derek Shepherd (Patrick Dempsey): Meredith's husband since Season 5, legally since Season 7. He was originally married to Addison Montgomery; they divorced in the third season. Derek is the father of Zola Grey Shepherd, Derek Bailey Shepherd, and Ellis Shepherd. In season 11, episode 21, "How To Save A Life," his car is T-boned by a semi; he dies of a head injury.
 Zola Grey Shepherd: Daughter of Meredith and Derek who is brought over with the children from Africa under the direction of Karev in Season 7. She has a spinal disease, is treated by Derek with a shunt, and he and Meredith adopted her.
 Derek Bailey Shepherd: Son of Meredith and Derek, delivered via C-section due to a face presentation. The obstetrician who operates on Meredith is called away, and an intern completes the stitching. She begins bleeding from everywhere. Meredith diagnoses herself as in DIC. Miranda performs a spleen removal, which saves Meredith's life. Derek and Meredith name their baby after Miranda Bailey.
 Ellis Shepherd: Second daughter of Meredith and Derek. She was born during the time jump after Derek's funeral in "She's Leaving Home."

Lexie Grey's family

 Meredith Grey (Ellen Pompeo): The daughter of Thatcher Grey and Ellis Grey. Meredith is Lexie's older half-sister, whom Lexie meets at the beginning of the fourth season. Although Meredith isn't initially fond of Lexie and does not wish to know her, Meredith eventually warms up to Lexie, and the two become extremely close until Lexie's death.
 Susan Grey (Mare Winningham): The second wife of Thatcher Grey, and mother of Lexie Grey and Molly Grey-Thompson. Susan was always aware of Thatcher's first wife and daughter, but she doesn't meet Meredith until Molly is a patient at Seattle Grace. She reaches out to Meredith and encourages her to develop a relationship with Thatcher. At first, Meredith resists Susan's attempts to mother her but eventually thinks of Susan as a surrogate mother. Susan dies suddenly, following a rare complication from a routine procedure to treat her acid reflux and hiccups. Thatcher is devastated by her death and became an alcoholic.
 Thatcher Grey (Jeff Perry): Father of Meredith, Lexie, and Molly Grey. He was married to Ellis Grey, Meredith's mother, for about seven years. They divorced after she had an affair with Richard Webber. Thatcher blames Ellis for his estrangement from Meredith, saying Ellis is "cold" and won't let him get to know his daughter. After his first family's disintegration, Thatcher remained in Seattle and married his second wife, Susan. They had two daughters, Lexie and Molly. After Meredith moves to Seattle for her residency, Susan encourages Thatcher and Meredith to develop a relationship. However, Susan's sudden death devastates Thatcher, and he blames her death on Meredith. He becomes an alcoholic, and Lexie has to give up a residency at Massachusetts General Hospital to move to Seattle to care for her father. He eventually enters rehab and apologizes to his daughters. However, his alcoholism has destroyed his liver, and Meredith has to give him a portion of hers to save his life.
 Molly Grey-Thompson (Mandy Siegfried): Daughter of Thatcher and Susan Grey, Lexie's younger sister and Meredith's half-sister. She proposes to her husband, Eric, before being shipped out by the military to be stationed in Iraq. Originally a patient at Mercy West, Molly transfers to Seattle Grace when she is 32 weeks pregnant, and Addison operates to repair a congenital diaphragmatic hernia in Molly's baby. She later gives birth to a daughter, whom she names Laura.
 Laura Thompson: Daughter of Molly Grey and Eric Thompson and Lexie's niece and Meredith's half-niece. She is born premature and kept at Seattle Grace Hospital several weeks after her birth, prompting her grandfather Thatcher Grey to hang around. Niece of Alexandra (Lexie) Grey.
 Zola Grey Shepherd (Jela K. Moore, Heaven White): Daughter of Meredith and Derek and half-nieces of Lexie, who is brought over with the children from Africa under the direction of Karev in Season 7. She has a spinal disease but is treated by Derek with a shunt. They later adopt her. She is the half-niece of Alexandra (Lexie) Grey.
 Derek Bailey Shepherd: Son of Meredith and Derek, delivered via C-section because he is not in the correct position. While stitching Meredith up, the obstetrician who operates on Meredith is called away to another patient, and an intern completes the stitching. When she begins bleeding from everywhere, Meredith diagnoses herself as in DIC. Miranda performs a spleen removal, which saves Meredith's life. Derek and Meredith name their baby after Miranda Bailey. He is the half-nephew of Alexandra (Lexie) Grey, although never met by Lexie as she dies before Bailey is born.
 Ellis Shepherd: Second daughter of Meredith and Derek and Lexie's half-niece. She was born during the time jump after Derek's funeral in "She's Leaving Home." She is the half-niece of Alexandra (Lexie) Grey, although Lexie never meets Ellis as she dies before the baby is born.

Derek Shepherd's family

 Meredith Grey (Ellen Pompeo): Derek's second wife until season 11 episode 21, "How To Save A Life," when he dies of a head injury after a semi t-bones his car. She is the mother of Zola, Bailey, and Ellis.
 Addison Montgomery (Kate Walsh): Derek's first wife who cheated on him with Mark. She comes to Seattle at Richard's request, and the two attempt to reconcile. She ultimately moves to Los Angeles.
 Amelia Shepherd (Caterina Scorsone): Derek's sister and the youngest Shepherd child. She and Derek witnessed their father being murdered. She became addicted to prescription medication before crashing Derek's car while under the influence. Amelia worked with Addison in Los Angeles and is her son's godmother. She has slept with Mark (as have Nancy and Addison before her). She is currently Chief of Neuro at Grey Sloan.
 Zola Grey Shepherd (Jela K. Moore, Heaven White): Daughter of Meredith and Derek, who is brought over with the children from Africa under the direction of Karev in Season 7. She has a spinal disease but is treated by Derek with a shunt. They later adopt her.
 Derek Bailey Shepherd: Son of Meredith Grey and Derek Shepherd, delivered via C-section because he is not in the correct position. While stitching Meredith up, the obstetrician who operates on Meredith is called away to another patient, and an intern completes the stitching. When she begins bleeding from everywhere, Meredith diagnoses herself as in DIC. Miranda performs a spleen removal, which saves Meredith's life. Derek and Meredith name their baby after Miranda Bailey.
 Ellis Shepherd: Second daughter of Meredith and Derek, born nine months after Derek's death.
 Carolyn Maloney-Shepherd (Tyne Daly): Derek's mother, who cared for Derek and his sisters after her husband was murdered. She disapproved of Addison and felt that Derek was much more suited to being with Meredith. Because she thought that Amelia's personality resembled her father, Carolyn distanced herself from her youngest daughter out of grief, which strained their relationship as she let Derek regretfully take responsibility for watching out for Amelia.
 Kathleen "Kate" Shepherd (Amy Acker): One of Derek's sisters, initially only mentioned in passing before appearing in "Good Shepherd", apparently is married to a diplomat and has children. Derek mentions she is a therapist, though Amelia later indicates she is a psychiatrist. She and Nancy have a poor relationship with Amelia.
 Liz Shepherd (Neve Campbell): One of Derek's sisters, also married with children. After the nerves in Derek's hand are damaged in a plane crash, she donates a nerve in her leg to repair his hand. Like her siblings, she is a doctor though her specialty is unknown and though it is unlikely that she is a psychiatrist or a neurosurgeon. She tries to encourage Meredith to reach out to the Shepherds more because they are family.
 Nancy Shepherd (Embeth Davidtz): One of Derek's sisters. She slept with Mark (as revealed in the episode "Let The Angels Commit"). She tells her brother, "Come on, Derek. Everyone sleeps with Mark." She dislikes Meredith and admires Addison, possibly due to their being OB/GYN doctors.
 Alexandra "Lexie" Caroline Grey (Chyler Leigh): Becomes Derek's half sister-in-law when he and Meredith Grey marry. Lexie later dies in the plane crash in the season 8 finale titled 'Flight.'
 Margaret "Maggie" Pierce (Kelly McCreary): Becomes Derek's half-sister-in-law when he and Meredith marry.
Scout Derek Shepherd-Lincoln: Son of Amelia and Link, therefore Derek's nephew. He was born in the Season 16 finale, and he was named in the Season 17 premiere.

Cristina Yang's family

 Helen Yang Rubenstein (Tsai Chin): Cristina's mother. Helen and Cristina's father divorced (Cristina watched her father die as they were both in a car accident), and she remarried Dr. Saul Rubenstein, an oral surgeon when Cristina was three. She thinks Cristina should focus more on getting married and less on her career.

Izzie Stevens's family

 Hannah Klein (Liv Hutchings): The adoptive daughter of Caroline and Dustin Klein, and the biological child of Izzie Stevens (born 1996). In the third season, an 11-year-old Hannah is admitted to Seattle Grace Hospital with leukemia, and Izzie donates bone marrow to her. However, Hannah's parents believed she was too exhausted from treatment to meet her mother.  
 Robbie Stevens (Sharon Lawrence): Izzie's mother, who now works as a waitress.
 Denny Duquette Jr. (Jeffrey Dean Morgan): Izzie's 36-year-old fiancé for a short time before he died of a stroke after receiving a heart transplant. In his will, he leaves Izzie $8,700,000, with which she opens the "Denny Duquette Memorial Clinic" that provides free health checkups to patients. 
 Eli Stevens and Alexis Stevens (Mark Nunez and Kennedy Bryan): Fraternal twin son and daughter of Izzie Stevens and Alex Karev (born 2014). Izzie decided to freeze her eggs during the fifth season episode "Elevator Love Letter" when she was diagnosed with cancer, as they would not survive the cancer treatment. But, to give them a better chance at being viable, Alex fertilized them as embryos had a stronger chance for survival. When Alex called Izzie for help during Meredith's medical license trial, he discovers he is a father—something his second wife theorized was a possibility in the twelfth season episode "I Choose You".

Richard Webber's family

 Camille Travis (Tessa Thompson / Camille Winbush): Adele's niece, daughter of Adele's sister Arlene. She was diagnosed with ovarian cancer when she was 14, and the cancer returns when she is a senior in high school. Dr. Bailey orders the interns to plan a prom in the hospital for her.
 Arlene Travis (Shelley Robertson): Adele's sister and Camille's mother.
 Adele Webber (Loretta Devine): Dr. Webber's first wife. Frequently frustrated by his devotion to the hospital, she eventually leaves him. She becomes pregnant with his child but has a miscarriage. They have since reconciled. She has recently been diagnosed with Alzheimer's disease. She dies of a heart attack in the Season 9 winter premiere.
 Catherine Fox (Debbie Allen): Richard's second wife, whom he marries in season 11.
 Margaret "Maggie" Pierce (Kelly McCreary): Richard's biological daughter with Ellis Grey.

George O'Malley's family

 Harold O'Malley (George Dzundza): Father of George, he was a truck driver with a passion for vintage cars. He was married for 40 years to his wife, Louise, and they had three sons: Jerry, Ronny, and George. He is very proud of all of his sons, but he often has trouble relating to George. He is admitted to Seattle Grace with esophageal cancer that has spread to his stomach, as well as a leaking aortic valve. He undergoes surgery to replace the valve successfully and later has a second surgery to determine the extent of the cancer. Before the second surgery, he asks Dr. Webber and Dr. Bailey to remove the tumor regardless of the risk to give him a chance to fight the cancer. The surgery proves too much for his body and, after several days, he goes into multi-system organ failure, which prompts the family to remove him from life support.
 Jerry O'Malley (Greg Pitts): George's brother, who works at a dry cleaner.
 Louise O'Malley (Debra Monk): George's mother, who works as a teacher. George seems to find her a little overbearing and is often embarrassed by her good-natured gestures, such as setting out breakfast for the interns during rounds and offering to iron his scrubs. She is a devout Catholic, and she is very upset when George and Callie get divorced.
 Ronny O'Malley (Tim Griffin): George's brother, who works at the post office.
 Callie Torres (Sara Ramirez): George's ex-wife. They get married in Las Vegas in Season 3 and later divorce in Season 4 because George is in love with Izzie.

Alex Karev's family

 Jo Karev (Camilla Luddington): Alex's second wife, a surgical innovation fellow who works at Grey Sloan Memorial Hospital. Who he later divorces in season 16 to go live with ex-wife Izzie Stevens.
 Jimmy Evans (James Remar): Alex's father, a heroin addict, who was often gone during his childhood. He used to beat Alex and Aaron, while Amber was too young during that time to recall Jimmy's behavior to her brothers. It's still unexplained how he disappeared from Alex's life, but since Alex, Aaron, and Amber spent most of their childhood in and out of foster care, it's assumed he just left. Because of how Jimmy beat up Alex's mother, Alex became a wrestler to defend his mother. In season ten, he returns unknowingly into Alex's life due to being brought to Grey Sloan Hospital for treatment. By then, it has been revealed that he was living as a struggling musician. After arriving in an ambulance, he asks Alex for something, which causes Alex to realize the patient might be his father. Though Alex does not want to know the result of a DNA-match suggested by Jo, she reveals the results anyway, which confirms that Jimmy is Alex's father. Alex begins secretly visiting the bar where his father starts playing after recovering, and during one visit, Jimmy and Alex talk of childhood and regrets. Because Jimmy had taught Alex how to play guitar as a child, Alex assumes the discussion is about him and is goaded into playing a tune that brings memories back to Jimmy. When Alex learns that Jimmy is talking about Nicky, his son, by another woman, Alex angrily beats his father. Jimmy fails to understand Alex's anger when the latter tells Jimmy never to return to Nicky and his mother until after Alex leaves and Jimmy realizes that Alex is his son. During Jimmy's attempts to go clean, he winds up in the hospital from through withdrawal. Jo has to take care of him, which causes strain in her and Alex's relationship.
 Aaron Karev (Jake McLaughlin): Alex's younger brother, who works as a mover. He is very nice and polite, so Cristina names him "Angel Spawn," while she calls Alex "Evil Spawn." He comes to Seattle Grace with a hernia, which Dr. Bailey successfully repairs. He's very chatty and tells the doctors about his and Alex's troubled childhood. He is later diagnosed with schizophrenia after he has a psychotic break and tries to kill his younger sister, Amber. As a result, he has been committed to a psychiatric ward.
 Amber Karev: Alex's younger sister, a high school student. Aaron is trying to convince her to go to college, but she doesn't see the point.
 Nicky Evans: Alex's younger paternal half-brother. It's assumed he still lives with his mother in South Florida.
 Helen Karev (Lindsay Wagner): Alex's mother. Helen was diagnosed with a mental disorder but has recovered enough to resume her job at her local library. Alex and Jo visit her in Iowa in season 14 episode "Fight For Your Mind."
Eli Stevens and Alexis Stevens (Mark Nunez and Kennedy Bryan): Son and daughter of Izzie Stevens and Alex Karev. Izzie decided to freeze her eggs during Grey's fifth season when she was diagnosed with cancer, as they would not survive the cancer treatment. But, to give them a better chance at being viable, Alex fertilized them. Izzie asked Alex to give her his sperm to freeze her embryos to have children one day. Izzie left Seattle Grace and started anew on a farm in Kansas. Izzie later divorced Alex and kept the fertilized embryos, which she used to have the twins. Later in Season 16, Meredith was going through legal trouble, and Alex called Izzie to write a letter to the medical counsel on why Meredith should keep her medical license. Izzie and Alex caught up, and he found out that he was the father of her twins. In Season 16, he leaves Grey Sloan and Jo and goes to Kansas to meet his kids and meet Izzie. He later wrote letters to Jo, Meredith, Richard, and Bailey, explaining what had happened and why he left.

Miranda Bailey's family

 Tucker Jones (Cress Williams): Miranda's ex-husband who divorces her because she spends more time working than at home with him and Tuck. Tucker is operated on by Derek when he is involved in a car accident on his way to the hospital for their son's birth.
 William George "Tuck" Bailey Jones: Miranda's son with her ex-husband Tucker.
 Ben Warren (Jason George): Miranda's current husband, whom she marries in Season 9.
 Joey Phillips (Noah Alexander Gerry): Miranda and Ben's adoptive son, who currently lives with them.
 Pruitt Arike Miller (Janai Kaylani): Dean Miller and JJ Lau's daughter, who was adopted by Miranda and Ben after the death of Dean.

Mark Sloan's family

 Unnamed grandson: Mark's grandson through Sloan, who gave him up for adoption.
 Sloan Riley (Leven Rambin): Mark's biological daughter. As an 18-year-old, she gives birth to Mark's grandson and puts him up for adoption.
 Sofia Robbins Sloan Torres: Mark's daughter with Callie Torres and Arizona Robbins. Conceived after Mark and Callie begin several trysts after Callie is left in the airport by Arizona, she is born prematurely on March 31, 2011, in "Song Beneath the Song."

Teddy Altman's family

 Henry Burton (Scott Foley): Husband of Dr. Teddy Altman. She meets and marries him in Season 7 to use her health insurance to cover the ongoing costs of his treatment for Von Hippel–Lindau disease. They eventually fall in love. He dies in season 8 while undergoing surgery.
 Allison Hunt: Daughter with Owen, born in season 15.
 Leo Hunt: Adopted son with Owen.

Callie Torres's family

 Uncle Berto: Callie's uncle, whom she assumes might be gay, saying "he hasn't been single for 60 years for no reason."
 George O'Malley (T. R. Knight): Callie's ex-husband. They got married in Las Vegas in season 3 and later divorced in season 4 because George is in love with Izzie. George dies in season 5 after being diagnosed brain dead after getting hit by a bus to save a woman's life.
 Arizona Robbins (Jessica Capshaw): Callie's ex-wife. A pediatric surgery attending, Arizona comes from a military family.
 Aria Torres: Callie's sister, only mentioned on the show.
 Carlos Torres (Héctor Elizondo): Father to Dr. Callie Torres. He originally is against his daughter's bisexuality and relationship with Dr. Arizona Robbins.
 Lucia Torres (Gina Gallego): Mother to Dr. Callie Torres. She has problems with accepting her daughter's bisexuality and refuses to attend her wedding to Arizona.
 Sofia Robbin Sloan Torres: Callie's daughter, born prematurely on March 31, 2011, in "Song Beneath the Song." She is conceived after Mark and Callie begin several trysts when Callie is left in the airport by Arizona.

Arizona Robbins's family

 Barbara Robbins (Judith Ivey): Arizona's mother.
 Colonel Daniel Robbins, United States Marine Corps (Denis Arndt): Arizona's father.
 Timothy Robbins: Arizona's brother, who died in the Iraq war.
 Callie Torres (Sara Ramirez): Arizona's ex-wife and attending orthopedic surgeon at Grey Sloan Memorial Hospital. They reconcile after Robbins's departure. 
 Sofia Robbin Sloan Torres: Arizona's daughter, born prematurely on March 31, 2011, in the "Song Beneath the Song" episode. She is conceived after Mark and Callie begin several trysts when Callie is left in the airport by Arizona. Arizona now has sole custody of Sofia due to a family court ruling in season 12.

Jackson Avery's family

 Dr. April Kepner: Avery's ex-wife and former Trauma surgeon at Grey Sloan Memorial Hospital. After Jackson confesses his feelings for April at the altar during her wedding to paramedic Matthew Taylor, April and Jackson elope. They have had an on and off again relationship and built-in sexual tension since Jackson took April's virginity before their board exam. April failed and blamed Jackson for Jesus punishing her for premarital sex.
 Samuel Norbert Avery: Avery and Kepner's late son born at 24 weeks due to type II osteogenesis imperfecta. He was baptized before dying soon after in his parents' arms.
 Harriet Kepner-Avery: Avery and Kepner's daughter. She was conceived during a moment of passion between April and Jackson amid their fighting. Things aren't patched up after their one-night affair, and they decided to divorce. Before signing the divorce papers, April discovered she was pregnant. Overjoyed that she could still conceive, she decided to keep the pregnancy secret out of fear that something is wrong, like her last pregnancy. After a while, Arizona Robbins discovers that April is pregnant and urges her to tell Jackson, and when April doesn't do it, Arizona does it herself. Jackson is at first angry but comes to understand it, and they agree to raise her as co-parents. Harriet was born during a cesarean section with April under no anesthesia because April was in Meredith's kitchen, and there was no way to go to the hospital. Soon, Catherine comes to accept April as a mother, and since Jackson and April decided to give Harriet both of their last surnames, Catherine is finally happy to see the Avery name kept alive. She was named after the famous Harriet Tubman. 
 Dr. Catherine Fox (formerly Avery) (Debbie Allen): Avery's mother and a brilliant urological surgeon. She appears at Seattle Grace Mercy West to perform the "first" penis transplant in the U.S. She proctors the boards in San Francisco, where she also has a one-night affair with Dr. Webber. She and Dr. Webber eventually began a relationship and are now married.
 Dr. Richard Webber: Avery's stepfather, following his marriage to Catherine Fox.
 Dr. Harper Avery: Grandfather of Jackson Avery and a world-renowned surgeon.
 Robert Avery (Eric Roberts): Avery's father and Catherine Fox's ex-husband, appears in "Who Is He (And What Is He to You)?". He considered himself unsuited to being an Avery and living up his father's medical legacy, Dr. Harper Avery, and left his family behind and has not since thought of his son. Jackson meets him in Bozeman, Montana, where Robert is satisfied with owning a local diner. While Jackson is glad to have met him, he informs Robert that he does not consider him his father.

Guest stars 
 Marla Sokoloff as Glenda Castillo (2015)
 Neve Campbell as Lizzie Shepherd (2012)
 Summer Glau as Emily Kovach (2012)
 James Avery as Sam (2012)
 Nia Vardalos as Karen (2012)
 Demi Lovato as Hayley May (2010)
 Paola Andino as Lily Price (2010)
 Mandy Moore as Mary Portman (2010)
 Vanessa Martínez as Gretchen Price (2010)
 Ryan Devlin as Bill Portman (2010)
 Jennifer Westfeldt as Jen Harmon (2009)
 Faye Dunaway as Dr. Margaret Campbell (2009)
 Bernadette Peters as Sarabeth Breyers (2008)
 Seth Green as Nick Hanscom (2007)
 Maggie Siff as Ruthie Sales (2007)
 Bellamy Young as Kathy (2007)
 John Cho as Dr. Marshall Stone (2006)
 Laurie Metcalf as Beatrice Carter (2006)
 Christina Ricci as Hannah Davies (2006)
 Millie Bobby Brown as Ruby (2014)

Other characters 
 Joe the Bartender (Steven W. Bailey): The owner of the Emerald City Bar, located across from the hospital, where the doctors often go for a drink. Joe collapses due to an aneurysm in the episode "Raindrops Keep Falling on my Head," and Derek and Burke perform a stand-still surgery to repair it. Joe and his boyfriend Walter attend the Thanksgiving dinner Izzie hosts at Meredith's house, and they go on a camping trip with Dr. Shepherd, Preston, Richard, Alex, and George. During the trip, Joe reveals during a discussion with the Chief that, although he and Walter have been "on-and-off" for about ten years, they are now committed and considering the possibility of children. They are one of two couples being considered as adoptive parents for a young mother's twins.
 Walter (Jack Yang): Joe's boyfriend.
 Bonnie Crasnoff (Monica Keena): A patient admitted to Seattle Grace Hospital after being involved in a train crash, she and another passenger, Tom, are connected by a large metal pole passing through their bodies. Since moving the pole would kill them, the doctors decide to move one of the patients off the pole and then operate around the pole to repair the other patient's damage. Since her injuries are more severe, they decide to move her, and she dies almost immediately. Bonnie reappears in Season 3 as part of Meredith's dream after drowning.
 Dennison "Denny" Duquette, Jr. (Jeffrey Dean Morgan): A patient waiting for a heart transplant, he develops a close relationship with Izzie and eventually proposes to her. Izzie risks her career to save him by cutting his LVAD wire, ensuring that he will become so ill that he will get a new heart. He dies from a blood clot shortly after the transplant but reappears in Season 3 as part of Meredith's dream after she nearly drowns, and again in Season 5. Izzie begins to see Denny everywhere, which is eventually revealed to be a symptom of her brain tumor. He first appears in the Season 2 episode "Begin the Begin" and makes his last appearance in the Season 5 episode "Here's to Future Days."
 Dylan Young (Kyle Chandler): As the commanding officer of the Seattle Police Department bomb squad, he responds to the bomb scare and helps to keep Meredith calm as she holds the bomb located inside a patient's body. She removes the bomb safely from the patient, but it explodes while Dylan carries it out of the OR. He reappears in Season 3 as part of Meredith's dream after her near-drowning.
 Amanda (Shannon Lucio): A young woman saved from being hit by a bus by George, who was himself subsequently dragged several yards by the bus and dies. Amanda is extremely concerned about him, and she stays with him in the ICU, referring to him as "her prince." She attends George's funeral and cries harder than his mother. Amanda keeps a daily vigil outside the hospital until Izzie confronts her, pointing out that she is still alive thanks to George and that she should honor him by living her life.
 Rebecca Pope or "Ava" (Elizabeth Reaser): A patient with amnesia after being badly injured in the ferry crash, she is discovered by Dr. Alex Karev, and they develop a very close relationship. While at Seattle Grace, she delivers a baby girl and undergoes extensive facial reconstruction surgery, performed by Dr. Mark Sloan. She eventually regains her memory and returns home with her husband, Jeff. However, before leaving, she pleads with Alex to "give [her] a reason to stay." She returns six weeks later, claiming to be pregnant with Alex's child. Although initially upset, Alex eventually becomes excited about having a baby with her. However, she is found to have a false pregnancy. When she attempts suicide, Izzie intervenes and has her admitted to the psychiatric ward. Elizabeth Reaser was nominated for the Outstanding Guest Actress in a Drama Series at the 59th Primetime Emmy Awards, for her role on the show.
 Gary Clark (Michael O'Neill): Husband of a patient at Seattle Grace, his wife is treated by Dr. Lexie Grey and Dr. Webber. After surgery, his wife goes into a coma and, since she has earlier signed a DNR, she is removed from life support. Clark files a lawsuit against Dr. Shepherd for wrongful death, but loses. In the Season 6 finale, he returns to the hospital intending to kill Dr. Shepherd, Dr. Lexie Grey, and Dr. Webber. He shoots several people, including Derek Shepherd, Owen Hunt, Reed Adamson, Charles Percy, and Alex Karev. After a tense standoff with Dr. Webber, he uses his last bullet to commit suicide instead of killing Dr. Webber.
 Mary Portman (Mandy Moore): Miranda Bailey's patient during the Seattle Grace shooting, she is the wife of Bill Portman. She helps Miranda attempt to save Charles Percy's life, and, despite their efforts, he dies. She returns to the hospital six months later to have the colostomy reversal she was supposed to have had the day of the shooting. Although the surgery is successful, Mary never wakes up. She is removed from life support one month later and dies.
 Bill Portman (Ryan Devlin): Husband of Mary Portman.
 Dr. Penny Blake (Samantha Sloyan): Derek Shepherd's doctor when he was brought in to Dillard Medical Center after a semi t-bones him. He consequently dies after failing to get a head CT. She later begins dating Callie Torres and transfers to Grey-Sloan as a surgical resident, where Meredith works. Meredith makes life difficult for Penny to work, but they eventually overcome their differences and work together because Meredith sees her potential as a general surgeon. She wins a grant and moves to New York, sparking a custody battle between Callie and Arizona when Callie wants to take Sofia with her.

References

External links 
 Official blog of Joe the bartender
 Official blog of nurse Debbie

 
Grey's Anatomy